S. Janaki is an Indian singer who has sung over 10,000 songs in various Indian languages. The following is a list of Kannada songs recorded by her:

film songs

1950s–1960s

1970s

1970

1971

1972

1973

1974

1975

1976

1977

1979

1978

1980s

1980

1981

1982

1983

1984

1985

1986

1987

1988

1989

1990s

1990

1991

1992

1993

1994

1995

2000s and 2010s

References

Janaki, S.